Iacopo Bianchi (born 5 May, 1998) is an Italian rugby union player.
His usual position is as a Flanker and he currently plays for Zebre, in Pro14 and for Fiamme Oro in Top10, on loan as Permit Player.

For the 2018–2019 Pro14 season, Bianchi was named as Additional Player for Zebre and in the 2019–2020 Pro14 season he was named as Permit Player ever for Zebre.

In 2017 and 2018, Bianchi was named in the Italy Under 20 squad. On 26 May he was called in Italy A squad for the South African tour in the 2022 mid-year rugby union tests against Namibia and Currie Cup XV team.

Notes

References

External links 
It's RugbyFrance profile
Ultimate Rugby Profile

Italian rugby union players
1998 births
Living people
Rugby union flankers
Fiamme Oro Rugby players
Zebre Parma players
Sportspeople from Arezzo